Joseph Leo Doob (February 27, 1910 – June 7, 2004) was an American mathematician, specializing in analysis and probability theory.

The theory of martingales was developed by Doob.

Early life and education
Doob  was born in Cincinnati, Ohio, February 27, 1910, the son of a Jewish couple, Leo Doob and Mollie Doerfler Doob. The family moved to New York City before he was three years old. The parents felt that he was underachieving in grade school and placed him in the Ethical Culture School, from which he graduated in 1926. He then went on to Harvard where he received a BA in 1930, an MA in 1931, and a PhD (Boundary Values of Analytic Functions, advisor Joseph L. Walsh) in 1932. After postdoctoral research at Columbia and Princeton, he joined the Department of Mathematics of the University of Illinois in 1935 and served until his retirement in 1978. He was a member of the Urbana campus's Center for Advanced Study from its beginning in 1959. During the Second World War, he worked in Washington, D. C. and Guam as a civilian consultant to the Navy from 1942 to 1945; he was at the Institute for Advanced Study for the academic year 1941–1942 when Oswald Veblen approached him to work on mine warfare for the Navy.

Work
Doob's thesis was on boundary values of analytic functions. He published two papers based on this thesis, which appeared in 1932 and 1933 in the Transactions of the American Mathematical Society. Doob returned to this subject many years later when he proved a probabilistic version of Fatou's boundary limit theorem for harmonic functions.

The Great Depression of 1929 was still going strong in the thirties and Doob could not find a job. B.O. Koopman at Columbia University suggested that statistician Harold Hotelling might have a grant that would permit Doob to work with him. Hotelling did, so the Depression led Doob to probability.

In 1933 Kolmogorov provided the first axiomatic foundation for the theory of probability. Thus a subject that had originated from intuitive ideas suggested by real life experiences and studied informally, suddenly became mathematics. Probability theory became measure theory with its own problems and terminology.  Doob recognized that this would make it possible to give rigorous proofs for existing probability results, and he felt that the tools of measure theory would lead to new probability results.

Doob's approach to probability was evident in his first probability paper, in which he proved theorems related to the law of large numbers, using a probabilistic interpretation of Birkhoff's ergodic theorem. Then he used these theorems to give rigorous proofs of theorems proven by Fisher and Hotelling related to Fisher's maximum likelihood estimator for estimating a parameter of a distribution.

After writing a series of papers on the foundations of probability and stochastic processes including martingales, Markov processes, and stationary processes, Doob realized that there was a real need for a book showing what is known about the various types of stochastic processes, so he wrote the book Stochastic Processes. It was published in 1953 and soon became one of the most influential books in the development of modern probability theory.

Beyond this book, Doob is best known for his work on martingales and probabilistic potential theory.  After he retired, Doob wrote a book of over 800 pages: Classical Potential Theory and Its Probabilistic Counterpart. The first half of this book deals with classical potential theory and the second half with probability theory, especially martingale theory. In writing this book, Doob shows that his two favorite subjects, martingales and potential theory, can be studied by the same mathematical tools.

The American Mathematical Society's Joseph L. Doob Prize, endowed in 2005 and awarded every three years for an outstanding mathematical book, is named in Doob's honor.

Honors
 President of the Institute of Mathematical Statistics in 1950.
 Elected to National Academy of Sciences 1957.
 President of the American Mathematical Society 1963–1964.
 Elected to American Academy of Arts and Sciences 1965.
 Associate of the French Academy of Sciences 1975.
 Awarded the National Medal of Science by the President of the United States Jimmy Carter 1979.
 Awarded the Steele Prize by the American Mathematical Society. 1984.

Publications
Books

Articles

See also
Martingale (probability theory)
Doob–Dynkin lemma
Doob martingale
Doob's martingale convergence theorems
Doob's martingale inequality
Doob–Meyer decomposition theorem
Optional stopping theorem

Notes

External links

A Conversation with Joe Doob 
Doob biography
Record of the Celebration of the Life of Joseph Leo Doob

1910 births
2004 deaths
20th-century American mathematicians
21st-century American mathematicians
Columbia University staff
Harvard University alumni
Institute for Advanced Study visiting scholars
Jewish American scientists
Mathematical analysts
Mathematicians from Ohio
Members of the French Academy of Sciences
National Medal of Science laureates
People from Cincinnati
Presidents of the American Mathematical Society
Presidents of the Institute of Mathematical Statistics
Princeton University staff
Probability theorists
University of Illinois Urbana-Champaign faculty
Mathematical statisticians